Elections to Bexley Council were held on 7 May 1998. The whole council was up for election and the Conservative party gained control of the council from no overall control. The electoral system used was the "first past the post", meaning that each seat was given to the candidate with the most votes.

Election result

|}

Ward results

References

1998 London Borough council elections
Politics of the London Borough of Bexley
1998